Limeux is a commune in the Cher department in the Centre-Val de Loire region of France.

Geography

Population

Sights
 The church of St. Martin, dating from the eleventh century.
 The castle of Saragosse, built in the fourteenth century.
 The thirteenth-century chapel of the old priory of Saint-Laurent de Manzay.

See also
Communes of the Cher department

References

Communes of Cher (department)